Robin Sales is a British film editor with more than 50 credits.

Filmography

Editing

References

External links

British film editors
Living people
Year of birth missing (living people)